Trigger Hippy is an American rock band composed of former Black Crowes drummer Steve Gorman, bassist Nick Govrik, guitarist/singer Ed Jurdi, and singer Amber Woodhouse.

History
The group was initially formed as a casual collaboration between Govrik, Gorman and other Nashville musicians. Trigger Hippy made its live debut on February 2, 2009, at the Cox Capitol Theatre in Macon, Georgia.

The band played shows in 2011 and 2012, with a rotating cast of band members. A consistent lineup featuring Govrik and Gorman along with Joan Osborne, Jackie Greene, and Tom Bukovac came together and announced plans to record an album in the fall of 2012.

Trigger Hippy released their first EP on Record Store Day's Back to Black Friday on November 29, 2013.

Trigger Hippy released a full length album on September 30, 2014. 
In the summer of 2015, the band announced a lengthy break.

A new four piece lineup featuring Jurdi and Woodhouse was announced June 19, 2019.

A new album, Full Circle and Then Some was released in October 2019.

Members
Steve Gorman – drums (2009–present)
Nick Govrik – bass, vocals (2009–present)
Ed Jurdi – guitar, vocals (2019–present)
Amber Woodhouse – vocals (2019–present)

Former members
Audley Freed – guitar (2009–2012)
Jimmy Herring – guitar (2009–2010)
Jackie Greene – guitar, keyboards, vocals (2010–2015)
Tom Bukovac – guitar (2012–2015)
Joan Osborne – vocals (2010–2017)

Discography

Albums
 Trigger Hippy (Released September 30, 2014), Rounder Records
 Full Circle and Then Some (Released October 11, 2019), Turkey Grass)

References

External links 
 

The Black Crowes
Rock music groups from Tennessee
American hard rock musical groups
American blues rock musical groups
2009 establishments in Tennessee
Musical groups established in 2009
Thirty Tigers artists